Alden Township is a defunct township in Hettinger County in the U.S. state of North Dakota. The population was 18 at the 2000 census. It is now part of Central Hettinger unorganized territory along with Indian Creek Township.

Geography 
The latitude of Alden is 46.333N, and the longitude is -102.583W.

Demographics 
All residents are white and fall in the 45 to 64 age bracket.

References

Geography of Hettinger County, North Dakota
Defunct townships in North Dakota